Get Your Freak On is a live album released in 1995 by the Washington, D.C.-based go-go band Rare Essence. The album was recorded live at the Rhythms Nightclub in Landover, Maryland on November 25, 1994.

Track listing

Side A
"Get Your Freak On" – 8:59
"Holy Ghost" (written by James Banks, Eddie Marion, Henderson Thigpen) – 7:23
"Down 4 Whatever" – 3:01
"Turn Off the Lights" (written by Kenny Gamble) – 7:17

Side B
"Gonna Getcha Girl" – 8:11
"Uh Oh (Heads Up)" – 14:40
"Get Your Freak On" (studio version)– 5:02

Personnel
 Michael "Funky Ned" Neal – bass guitar
 Milton "Go-Go Mickey" Freeman – congas, timbales
 Leslie "Big L" McKenzie – drums
 John "J.B." Buchanan – flugabone, keyboards
 Derek Paige – flugelhorn, trumpet
 Andre "Whiteboy" Johnson – electric guitar, vocals
 Mark "Godfather" Lawson – keyboards
 Donnell Floyd – saxophone, vocals
 Charles "Shorty" Garris – vocals

References

External links
 Get Your Freak On at Discogs

1995 live albums
Rare Essence albums
Live rhythm and blues albums